The Houaphan bent-toed gecko (Cyrtodactylus houaphanensis) is a species of gecko that is endemic to Laos.

References 

Cyrtodactylus
Reptiles described in 2020